Tanning may refer to:

Tanning (leather), treating animal skins to produce leather
Sun tanning, using the sun to darken pale skin
Indoor tanning, the use of artificial light in place of the sun
Sunless tanning, application of a stain or dye to the skin (active ingredient in tanning lotion products is dihydroxyacetone (DHA)). 
Physical punishment, metaphorically, such as a severe spanking which leaves clear marks

See also
Skin whitening
Tan (color)
Tan (disambiguation)
Tannin (disambiguation)